Sheung Lok is one of the 22 constituencies in the Kowloon City District in Hong Kong. The constituency returns one district councillor to the Kowloon City District Council, with an election every four years.

Sheung Lok constituency is loosely based on the area around Ho Man Tin Estate and Sheung Lok Estate in Homantin with an estimated population of 20,454.

Councillors represented

Election results

2010s

2000s

1990s

Notes

References

Ho Man Tin
Constituencies of Hong Kong
Constituencies of Kowloon City District Council
1994 establishments in Hong Kong
Constituencies established in 1994